{{DISPLAYTITLE:C5H6N2}}
The molecular formula C5H6N2 may refer to:

 Aminopyridines
 2-Aminopyridine
 3-Aminopyridine
 4-Aminopyridine
 Diazepines
 1,2-Diazepine
 1,3-Diazepine
 1,4-Diazepine
 Glutaronitrile
 1-Vinylimidazole